Events from 2022 in French Polynesia.

Incumbents 

 President: Édouard Fritch
 President of the Assembly: Gaston Tong Sang

Events 
Ongoing – COVID-19 pandemic in French Polynesia

 22 September – USS Jackson arrives in Tahiti during an Oceana-based US Coast Guard operation.

Sports 

 15 – 24 July: French Polynesia at the 2022 World Athletics Championships

Deaths 

 31 July – Hubert Coppenrath, 91, Roman Catholic prelate, coadjutor archbishop (1997–1999) and archbishop (1999–2011) of Papeete

References 

2022 in French Polynesia
2020s in French Polynesia
Years of the 21st century in French Polynesia
French Polynesia